Kani Gorgeh (also Romanized as Kānī Gorgeh) is a village in Behi Dehbokri Rural District, Simmineh District, Bukan County, West Azerbaijan Province, Iran. At the 2006 census, its population was 102, in 20 families.

References 

Populated places in Bukan County